Ma Cheng may refer to:

 Ma Cheng (Junqian), style name Junqian, Eastern Han Dynasty general in the Book of the Later Han
 Ma Cheng (footballer), footballer for Wuhan Optics Valley F.C.
 Ma Cheng, a woman from Beijing who, due to her obscure name, frequently encounters issues regarding name registration in places such as airports and police stations